Belo is a settlement in the Municipality of Šmarje pri Jelšah in eastern Slovenia. It lies just east of Šmarje on the main road toward Rogaška Slatina. The area is part of the traditional region of Styria. The municipality is now included in the Savinja Statistical Region.

References

External links
Belo at Geopedia

Populated places in the Municipality of Šmarje pri Jelšah